Welcome to Tranquility is an American comic book series created by Gail Simone and Neil Googe and published by Wildstorm.

The series is set in Tranquility, a fictional town in Oregon, which is home to retired superheroes and supervillains (known colloquially as "Maxis") and their families. This town coexists with the existing Wildstorm Universe, with frequent references to its heroes, such as The Authority and Gen¹³.

Publication history
The ongoing series starts in December 2006. A new story arc started in issue #7. Like Stormwatch: Post Human Division, the series stopped at issue #12 and it then appeared as part of the Christos Gage-written "Wildstorm: Armageddon" crossover storyline, with artist Horacio Domingues.

Unlike Stormwatch: PHD, and other titles involved in that story, it was not one of those that has been announced as restarting in 2008 with World's End. However, Wildstorm editor Ben Abernathy has said Welcome to Tranquility would return in a six-issue limited series, entitled Welcome to Tranquility: One Foot in the Grave, with Simone returning to write it and Domingues staying on to provide the art.

Major characters

Sheriff Thomasina "Tommy" Lindo - Sheriff Lindo, or "Tommy", is the town's sheriff. Her main duties seem to consist of keeping peace when old rivalries flare up or when the more unbalanced inhabitants, such as Minxy Minerva, cause trouble. Rather than use swear words, she frequently uses euphemisms such as "doody", "dang", and "poop". Sheriff Lindo is the granddaughter of a Maxi hero known as The Black Glider, and the sister of Seresa Lindo, local pilot and assistant to Minxy Minerva. Romantically, she has been linked to deceased maxihero Mr. Articulate, who she freely admits to sleeping with after a stay in the hospital, during which he provided her with companionship. While Sheriff Lindo has been shown to have a quick temper, she is also an extremely courageous and compassionate person, placing herself in the line of danger to protect others, and showing more patience with the inhabitants of the town than almost anyone. To this end she uses a special energy-augmented baton made by Doc Tomorrow.

Colonel Isaac Cragg - Former member of the Liberty Squad, Colonel Cragg is the only man to serve in 3 branches of the U.S. Military simultaneously (Air Force, Navy and the Army) and holds the record for most enemy planes shot down in a career. He bears a scar across the left side of his face, and a blinded left eye, from a fight with Nazi Giant during his former military days. His combat and piloting abilities are more than likely superhuman in nature, given his record-breaking service record, coupled with the fact that some portion of said record was obtained with the limited depth perception of having only one eye. Colonel Cragg is known to have fought in World War II, but it is not known how far his service extended past the war's resolution. Colonel Cragg is usually seen with his assistant Bad Dogg. Cragg was also a pallbearer at Mr. Articulate's funeral, implying that the two were probably friends. Cragg has demonstrated difficulty adjusting to the modern era's political correctness.

Deputy Presley Duray - Former sheriff of Tranquility and currently a deputy for Sheriff Lindo. Presley lost his position as sheriff after a case in which a murder suspect in his custody committed suicide in his cell after an intense interrogation. After the suspect was found to be innocent and the real killer being caught the next day, with pictures of the murder found on his person, Presley was presumably fired or asked to resign. The guilt and shame from this event was discovered and thwarted by the newly appointed Sheriff Lindo, who deputized him.

Bad Dog - Bad Dog (real name unknown) was Colonel Cragg's topkick during their military service, and served with him on the Liberty Squad. He constantly wears a collar around his neck. He possesses superhuman "toughness," which likely consists of enhanced strength and endurance. He served as a pallbearer for Mr. Articulate, although he had a mild dislike for Mr. Articulate, due to his intelligence and expansive vocabulary. As this suggests, Bad Dog is known for having a temper, and has sometimes been shown to enter an almost feral mental state.

Emoticon - Real name unknown, Emoticon is a local teenager and grandson of a villain (and presumed Maxi) known as The Typist, and causes trouble for the citizens of Tranquility. He is disrespectful to most elders in the town. Emoticon dresses in a flashy style, including a fur coat, several necklaces and assorted other jewellery. His most distinctive feature, however, is a mask he wears, which covers his entire face. The mask displays his current emotions via a LCD screen, which expresses said emotion as a text "smiley". This mask apparently translates Emoticon's true feelings at the given moment and does not allow any attempts at concealment (effectively rendering him unable to lie.) Emoticon also speaks in netspeak, saying "lol" rather than actually laughing, and saying "All caps!" before yelling. Currently, Emoticon is being held on charges of being an accessory to Mr. Articulate's murder and possibly on the charge of assaulting a police officer. Emoticons face is horribly disfigured and without his mask he cannot see, the mask itself has a pair of replacement eyeballs for him, apparently a "gift" from the Typist himself who blinded and disfigured him as a way to bring a bit of "tragedy" in his secret origins. As an act of kindness, Sheriff Lindo allowed him to keep wearing his mask even after his incarceration so as to spare him the shame and fear of being imprisoned without it.

Mayor Alex Fury - Alex Fury, formerly a Maxi Hero known as "Judge Fury" and Liberty Squad leader, is the mayor of Tranquility and husband of former actress/Maxi Hero Suzy Fury, also known as The Pink Bunny. Mayor Fury's top priority is giving former heroes and villains alike a place to live out their golden years in peace and keeping the town running smoothly. He seems well-equipped to this end, having seemingly limitless reservoirs of patience and diplomacy, having only lost his temper once. Fury's known powers are superior combat ability, enhanced strength and near-invulnerability. As Judge Fury, he wore a black mask somewhat in the style of an executioner's mask,as well as a white suit with a black shirt and white tie. As Tranquility's mayor, he us usually seen in a similar suit, but with a smaller mask that only covers his face from just above his eyes to the bottom of his nose.

Suzy Fury - A former actress, pin-up model and superheroine, Suzy Fury (maiden name unknown) was the Liberty Squad's "secretary" (an obvious poke at Wonder Woman's position in the Justice Society) under the Maxi name Pink Bunny. At some point in the past, she married Judge Fury, and currently resides with him in Tranquility, where she runs a restaurant known as the Chik'n Go. She employs Leona Terrell as a waitress, and considers her to be like a daughter. Her only known Maxi power is that of enhanced strength (it has been claimed that she can throw a tank), though she may have some sort of attraction-based power, given the theme of her Maxi persona. Suzy was apparently given her powers in a super-soldier project headed by the O.S.U. This also created her arch rival: Rosario Munez, also known as "Hellkitten".

Dr. Rachel Steel - Rachel Steel is the town doctor, and a Maxi. Her powers seem linked to perception, giving her the ability to see through objects and to enhance her eyesight to see small details. These powers are precise enough to allow her to perform a complete murder autopsy without making a single incision, or even touching the body. Use of this power causes her eyes to glow, and seems to cause her enough pain to require the use of marijuana. She is not the highest ranking doctor in Tranquility, but is apparently the only one with powers.

Minor characters 
Acolyte - A World War II-era Maxi who possesses healing powers that she believes were given to her by God. Has her own line of "ouchless" bandages, and presumably other medical supplies.

Captain Cobra - Maxi resident of Tranquility (real name unknown) and sworn "Enemies to the DEATH!" with fellow Maxi and next-door neighbor, Mongoose Man. He has threatened to kill Mongoose Man for taking back apples from Mongoose Man's tree that fell on his side of the fence on more than one occasion. This argument has apparently progressed to the point where Deputy Troy expresses annoyance in being there again, and Sheriff Lindo has threatened to cut down the disputed tree.

Cedric - Collette Pearson's camera man. Has been assaulted and presumably murdered by an unknown assailant for his refusal to provide said assailant with the location of his boss, Collette.

Henry Hyde - Former nemesis of Maximum Man, Henry (Maxi name "Henry Hate") has since reformed. He has a twin brother, and was considered the foremost inventor of his time. He created a HATE Bomb which destroyed only living people, yet left material possessions and buildings untouched; it was this threat that brought people to Tranquility in the first place.

Seresa Lindo - Minxy Minerva's assistant and sister of Sheriff Lindo.

Lisa - The town dispatch officer. She has a daughter and apparently no super powers.

Minxy Minerva - Former child aviatrix and aeronautics engineer. Currently a resident of Tranquility. Despite her severe dementia (possibly caused by Alzheimer's disease) she still has powerful friends in top positions in the U.S. Government because her plane designs are credited with a large part of the Allied victory in World War II. Minxy continues building and flying airplanes, which usually results in spectacular crashes. Lindo has sought to revoke her license, or equipment, but Fury has vetoed this.

Mongoose Man - Real name unknown, Maxi resident of Tranquility and sworn "Enemies to the DEATH!" with fellow Maxi and next-door neighbor, Captain Cobra. Mongoose Man owns an apple tree, but takes back any apples that land on Captain Cobra's side of the fence between their houses. This argument has apparently progressed to the point where Deputy Troy expresses annoyance in being there again, and Sheriff Lindo has threatened to cut down the disputed tree.

Sampson Twins - Obnoxious Maxi twins who presumably (due to their comically large physiques) have enhanced strength. After the death of Mr. Articulate they were arrested for starting a bar brawl by insulting him. One twin speaks in classical English while the other speaks in a drawl with bad grammar and slang.

Slapjack - Slapjack (real name unknown, presumed last name "Terrell") is the father or father-in-law of Deena Terrell, and grandfather to Leona Terell. His only demonstrated power is being a speedster.

Arnold Stipple - Arnold Stipple, better known under his Maxi name of Cosmos, was a member of the Liberty Squad. Though acquitted, he is considered to have betrayed the Liberty Squad to a villain known as Were-Lizard, which resulted in the death of Earth's greatest hero, Astral Man. This leads to his home in Tranquility being vandalized quite often. Due to his status as a pariah, Arnold lives alone, save for several cats.

Deena Terrell - Daughter or daughter-in-law of Slapjack, and mother of Leona Terrell. Deena is a Christian Fundamentalist who is known for her abrasive personality.

Kevin Trueblood - Former member of the Liberty Squad, under the Maxi name of Maximum Man (possibly the origin of the term.) An homage to Captain Marvel, Kyle was a timid accountant until he spoke a secret word which granted him the power of "Indian Fakirs", transforming him into a Maxi with enhanced strength, invulnerability and the power of flight. In his old age, Kyle has forgotten the word. As of the fifth issue, Kyle has found out the word, which is "Hecatean".

Deputy Troy Veron - One of Sheriff Lindo's deputies.

Zeke - An undead Maxi, whose status as a hero or villain is unknown. Zeke's "death" occurred sometime in the 1960s. Zeke runs (and presumably named) Gate to the Underworld, the local cemetery and presumably the mortuary. A struggling popstar, an Elvis wannabe, he bargained with a demon for eternal youngness and everlasting life, in exchange for "looking on a little property", supposed to be the Gate to the Underworld. However, as Ezekiel repented and tried to escape, the demon badly disfigured him, thus ending his popstar career, but without taking his immortality, leaving him to be as a half-rotted corpse for eternity. He is seldom seen without his pet snake Hamnet, who is generally wrapped around his arm, and whom he talks to when no one is around.

Liberty Snots 
Former child stars who have grown up and become a Goth band after recruiting additional members, the Liberty Snots are generally considered bratty kids. There are two main characters, Kevin and Leona. The original members were once the "Tranquili-teens", who solved mysteries on a Saturday morning children's show.

Kevin Emils - Kevin, who prefers to be called "Sweet Sally" at all times, is the front man for the Liberty Snots. He possesses the ability to channel sound into forceful attacks.. He is the presumed father of his girlfriend, Leona Terrell's child. He is Kyle Truegood's godson, and is dating Leona. He hates being called Kevin and will always insist forcefully that his name is Sally.

Leona Terrell - Leona, who has taken the stage name of "Ajita", inherited her powers as a speedster from her grandfather, Slapjack. Leona is pregnant with Kevin's daughter. She works as a waitress at the Chick'n Go. Her mother is extremely controlling of her life. Leona has been attempting to pursue an acting career since the Tranquiliteens was cancelled but to no avail.

Arson - Real name unknown. Power of pyrokinesis. Seems to glean great satisfaction from the use of his powers and is seemingly the most temperamental of the Liberty Snots.

Freaksho - Real name and powers unknown. Thus far the only time he has spoken has been to level allegations against Deputy Durray. First about police brutality and then about sexual harassment, all within the space of a minute.

Mangacide - Jess dresses in a loligoth fashion. Powers involve psionic tentacles that grasp objects. Her origin was somewhat featured as a back-up story in issue #11. She recently got a job as a waitress at the Chick'n Go.

M-T - Byron is the grandson of the Maxi Doc Tomorrow. Powers involve some sort of enhanced intelligence and/or technopathy; he invents things, much like his grandfather. Actually, dislikes goth music. Had a brief relationship with Roxy Spaulding of Gen¹³.

Silicon Stiletto - Real name unrevealed. Powers involve clawed fingers. She also possesses superhuman strength as she lifted Sheriff Lindo off the ground with one hand and traded blows with the super-strong Caitlin Fairchild of Gen¹³. In addition, she possesses a degree of invulnerability, taking an energy blast to the face from the Authoriteen's Kid Apollo without injury.

Deceased
Astral Man - Real name unknown, he is the former leader of the Liberty Squad, Killed by Were-Lizard. There is a statue in the center of Tranquility bearing his likeness, as well as an inscription of his last words: "We must do right." His powers are unknown.

Arthur Hensford - An international detective during World War II, Arthur Hensford, better known as Mr. Articulate, was known for his chivalry, wit, elegant mannerisms, and his signature sword-cane and blue rose corsages. He visited Sheriff Lindo during her stay in the hospital and gave her small trinkets from his world traveling days, which eventually led her to reveal that he wasn't gay, as many of the townsfolk thought due to his nature, and even going so far as to quietly provide money for Leona Terrell to have an abortion. However, after his death, the Tattler implied a past relationship with Midnighter, an openly gay superhero. After his autopsy, it was revealed that Mr. Articulate was in the final stages of cancer and had he not been murdered, he would have had a month to live, at most.

Mr. Articulate's Death, #1-6

Sheriff Lindo attempts to dissuade journalist Collette Pearson from doing a story on Tranquility and its inhabitants, when Minxy crash lands once more. Lindo later asks Fury if she can do something to prevent Minxy's actions, but he disallows this in lieu of Minxy's years of heroic service.

At the hospital, Kevin arrives with the rest of the Liberty Snots, and demands to see Leona and his unborn child, or the group will attack the hospital. During this time, Henry is beaten by a shadowed assailant, who wants his deadliest weapon. Lindo asks Suzy to watch over Collette while she goes to the hospital. At the Chick'n Go, Collette mentions that she believes the water of Tranquility acts as a Fountain of Youth. Mayor Fury arrives and has a fight with Suzy, because he wants to protect Traquility's secret. He is scarred by hot grease, but punches Suzy, who calls Lindo, who has quelled the Snots' riot by letting Kevin see Leona at the request of Kyle Truegood. Wondering how she can go against Fury, Henry, who has made it to the hospital, reveals that he knew Kevin's secret word, something he lied about when asked days prior. Saying "Hecatean", Kevin becomes the much younger and mightier Maximum Man. However, Leona reveals that Articulate's killer was not the Mayor, and across town, Colonel Cragg approaches Bad Dog with Henry's bomb and tells him he has a heroic side and a darker one he can't quell. Bad Dog believes he has to beat some sense into his best friend.

Collected editions
The series was collected into two trade paperbacks:

Volume 1 (collects Welcome to Tranquility #1-6, 160 pages, WildStorm, December 2007)
Volume 2 (collects Welcome to Tranquility #7-12, 144 pages, WildStorm, May 2008)

Awards
In 2007, Thomasina Lindo of was named Best Female Character in the Glyph Comics Awards.

References

External links
Review of issue #1, #2, #4, #5, #7, #10 and #12 Comics Bulletin

2007 comics debuts
Comics by Gail Simone